Henk Tijms (Beverwijk, April 23, 1944) is a Dutch mathematician and Emeritus Professor of Operations Research at the VU University Amsterdam.

He studied mathematics in Amsterdam where he graduated from the University of Amsterdam in 1972 under supervision of Gijsbert de Leve. 

Tijms is the author of several articles on applied mathematics and stochastics and books on probability. His best-known books are Stochastic Modeling and Analysis (Wiley, 1986) and Understanding Probability (Cambridge University Press, 2004).

On October 12, 2008, Tijms became the first non-American to receive the 
INFORMS Expository Writing Award. The award honoured his achievements in the field of mathematics.

References

Living people
1944 births
Academic staff of the University of Amsterdam
Dutch mathematicians
People from Beverwijk
Dutch operations researchers